The 2014 NACRA Women's Sevens was the tenth tournament of the North America and Caribbean Women's Sevens Championship, the official rugby sevens continental championships organized by NACRA. Both the women's and men's competitions were held at the Campo Marte in Mexico City, Mexico on 3–4 December 2014.

Eight national teams competed in the women's tournament. Mexico as the winner qualified to compete at the 2015 Pan American Games in Toronto, Canada.

Pool stage

Pool A

Pool B

Elimination stage

Quarterfinals

Plate

Seventh place match

Fifth place match

Semifinals

Bronze medal match

Gold medal match

Final standings

References

2014
2014 rugby sevens competitions
2014 in North American rugby union
2014 in women's rugby union
International rugby union competitions hosted by Mexico
rugby union
rugby union
December 2014 sports events in Mexico
rugby union